Municipal election in Brno was held as part of Czech municipal elections in 2006. The Civic Democratic Party received highest number of votes but the Czech Social Democratic Party formed coalition and Romand Onderka became new Mayor.

Results

References

2006
2006 elections in the Czech Republic